Statistics Without Borders (SWB) is an organization of volunteers that provide pro bono statistical consulting and assistance to organizations or governments to help deal with health issues. SWB is sponsored by the American Statistical Association. Their goal is to help international health initiatives and projects be delivered more effectively through better use of statistics.

Some of the past and present projects include design and analysis about a survey about a public health intervention project in Sierra Leone, and another in Haiti, a survey of the impact of the economic impact of an earthquake in Haiti, reviewing food security survey projects for the Food and Nutritional Technical Assistance II (FANTA-2) project at the Academy for Educational Development, and helping to prepare a proposal to survey households in Mexico about their use of bottled water.

Projects

References

External links 
 Statistics Without Borders homepage

Statistical societies
Organizations established in 2008